El Maitén is a town in Argentina in Cushamen Department on the margins of the Chubut River, on the northwest of Chubut Province, in Patagonia. In older times it was the intermediate point in the railroad tracks of the Old Patagonian Express between the towns of  Ingeniero Jacobacci and Esquel.

Location 

Other connecting routes to El Maitén are National Route 243 towards El Bolsón and Bariloche in Río Negro Province, and Provincial routes RP 4 and RP 71, connecting to Cushamen and Epuyén respectively.

Geography and climate 
The town of El Maitén lies on the right margin of the Chubut River. The river's valley is of Glacial origin, and in this region it runs in a north–south direction on the first highlands of the Andes on the West, and the ancient formations of the Patagonia to the East. The topography is mountainous, but of lower elevations, always under .

This geographic region is a clear example of the transition between the humid wooded Andes areas to the West, and the classic more arid steppes of central Patagonia. Typical native trees of the area are the Austrocedrus chilensis, Coihue (Nothofagus dombeyi), Ñire (Nothofagus antarctica), and over 2,000 meters AMSL the Lenga (Nothofagus pumilio).

The climate is semi-steppe, with humid winters with occasional strong snows and an annual precipitation between, .

History and economy 
What started as a rural community was influenced greatly by the arrival of the General Roca railroad to the area in 1939, on a branch that continued to Esquel. This branch was completed and opened in 1945, and El Maitén was selected as the site of its maintenance sheds and locomotive warehouse. This changed the town towards a railroad-based economy until the 1970s, when the Argentine railroad industry started a steady decline.

Even though most of the railroad system on which El Maitén was a waystop closed in 1993, a train still operates out of El Maitén, running a loop from El Maitén to the train station Bruno J. Thomae then back to El Maitén.

See also
Old Patagonian Express

References

External links 
El Maitén website
Old Patagonian Express website

Populated places in Chubut Province

El Maitén